Solotnovo is a rural locality (a village) in Baydarovskoye Rural Settlement, Nikolsky District, Vologda Oblast, Russia. The population was 78 as of 2002.

Geography 
Solotnovo is located 19 km northeast of Nikolsk (the district's administrative centre) by road. Lokha is the nearest rural locality.

References 

Rural localities in Nikolsky District, Vologda Oblast